The Saturn Award for Best Breakthrough Performance is presented by the Academy of Science Fiction, Fantasy and Horror Films, in conjunction with their annual award-ceremony.

Recipients
Below is a list of recipients and the year their award was presented:

 Grant Gustin (2015)
 Melissa Benoist (2016)
 KJ Apa (2017)
 Amber Midthunder (2022)

References

External links
 Official Saturn Awards website

Saturn Awards
Mass media science fiction awards
Fantasy awards